Jönköpings-Posten (simply JP) is a Swedish language morning newspaper in published in Jönköping, Sweden.

History and profile
Jönköpings-Posten was first published on 17 January 1865. The paper is based in the town of Jönköping and is published six days per week from Monday to Saturday. It has a liberal stance and is published in broadsheet format.

Stig Fredrikson is among the former editors-in-chief of Jönköpings-Posten.

Jönköpings-Posten had a circulation of 32,800 copies in 2012 and 31,400 copies in 2013.

References

External links
 Official website
 

1865 establishments in Sweden
Newspapers established in 1865
Daily newspapers published in Sweden
Swedish-language newspapers
Mass media in Jönköping